Pedro Otacílio Figueiredo Airport  was the airport that served Vitória da Conquista, Brazil.

It was administrated by Socicam.

History
The airport was operated by Socicam between 2008 and 2019. The facility was decommissioned on July 23, 2019.

The following airlines once served the airport: Azul Brazilian Airlines, Gol Transportes Aéreos, Voepass.

Accidents and incidents
6 March 1955: a Real Transportes Aéreos Douglas DC-3/C-53-D-DO registration PP-YPZ crashed during approach to land at Vitória da Conquista. The landing gear was lowered but the undercarriage did not lock. The pilot made an overshoot and during a turn to the left the aircraft struck a pole, crashed and caught fire. Of the 21 passengers and crew aboard, 5 died.
9 October 1985: a Nordeste Embraer EMB110C Bandeirante registration PT-GKA operating a cargo flight from Vitória da Conquista to Salvador da Bahia crashed during initial climb from Vitória da Conquista after flying unusually low. The two crew members died.

Access

See also

References

External links

Defunct airports in Brazil
Airports disestablished in 2019
2019 disestablishments in Brazil